Alessandro Zaccone (born 16 January 1999) is an Italian Grand Prix motorcycle racer, contracted to compete for Gresini Racing in the 2022 Moto2 World Championship.

Career

Early career
Zaccone began competing as a child; in 2008, he was regional mini-bike champion and fourth at the national level. In the following years, he continued with the MiniGP and some CIV races in the Moto3 category. He made his international debut in 2013 by participating, with the Honda Italia team, in the Imola Grand Prix of the European Junior Cup. In the same season, he finished in sixteenth place in the Italian Moto3 championship.

In 2014, Zaccone took part in the last four races on the calendar of the European Superstock 600 Championship with a Honda CBR600RR of the Talmácsi Racing team. He collected sixteen points with which he finished in twentieth place in the riders' standings. The following season he competed in the European Superstock 600 with the same team as in 2014. He finished in nineteenth scoring twenty-one points. In 2016, Zaccone, together with Axel Bassani, rode for the San Carlo Team Italia with which he took part in the races in the European section of the Supersport World Championship. Riding a Kawasaki ZX-6R, he finished in third place in the Europe Supersport Cup and seventeenth overall. In 2017, he moved to the MV Agusta Reparto Corse team with which he competed again for the European Cup of the Supersport World Championship. He scored seventeen points with which he finished third in the ESC and twenty-third overall. In the 2018 and 2019, Zaccone competed in the CEV Moto2 class, with the Promoracing team.

MotoE World Championship
In 2020, Zaccone made his debut in the world championship, racing in the MotoE class with the Trentino Gresini team with Matteo Ferrari as his teammate. He ended the season in 12th place with 37 points. 

In 2021, he moved to the Pramac Racing team, with teammate Yonny Hernández. On 2 May, he obtained his first victory in the category, temporarily taking the lead in the world championship.

Moto2 World Championship

Gresini Racing Moto2 (2022)

Career statistics

Supersport World Championship

Races by year
(key) (Races in bold indicate pole position; races in italics indicate fastest lap)

Grand Prix motorcycle racing

By season

By class

Races by year
(key) (Races in bold indicate pole position, races in italics indicate fastest lap)

References

External links

1999 births
Living people
Sportspeople from Rimini
Italian motorcycle racers
Supersport World Championship riders
MotoE World Cup riders
Moto2 World Championship riders